This Love of Ours is a 1945 American drama film directed by William Dieterle and starring Merle Oberon, Claude Rains, Charles Korvin and Carl Esmond. The film's composer, Hans J. Salter, was nominated for an Academy Award for Best Original Score in 1946. This drama from Universal Pictures was later remade as Never Say Goodbye (1956) and the French television film Comme avant, mieux qu'avant (1972).

Plot

Cast
Merle Oberon as Karin Touzac, also known as Florence Hale
Claude Rains as Dr. Joseph Targel
Charles Korvin as Michel Touzac
Carl Esmond as Uncle Robert
Sue England as Susette Touzac
Jess Barker as Chadwick
Helene Thimig as Tucker
Harry Davenport as Dr. Jerry Wilkerson
Dave Willock as Dr. Dailey
Ralph Morgan as Dr. Lane
Howard Freeman as Dr. Barnes
Fritz Leiber as Dr. Bailey

External links

 

1945 films
American black-and-white films
Universal Pictures films
Films directed by William Dieterle
American films based on plays
Films based on works by Luigi Pirandello
American drama films
1945 drama films
Films scored by Hans J. Salter
1940s English-language films
1940s American films